Xanthostemon youngii, commonly known as  crimson penda or red penda, is a species of trees endemic to North Queensland, constituting part of the plant family Myrtaceae.

It has showy red blooms, but has been difficult to keep alive in cultivation.

It is extremely prone to Myrtle Rust disease that has spread rapidly throughout the east coast of Australia.

References

External links
 Xanthostemon youngii Google images. –a good collection of photos.

youngi
Myrtales of Australia
Flora of Queensland
Garden plants of Australia